This is a list of notable soap-makers. It lists notable soapmakers and soap ateliers.
William Bell Allen (1812–1869), Irish-Australian soapmaker 
William Johnston Allen (1835–1915), Australian soap manufacturer, son of William Bell Allen
Eberhard Anheuser (1806–1880), German-American soapmaker, father-in-law of Adolphus Busch
Louis Honoré Arnavon (1786–1841), French soap manufacturer
Samuel van den Bergh (1864–1941), Dutch soap manufacturer
Emanuel Bronner (1908–1997), German-American soapmaker
William Burford (1845–1925), Australian soapmaker, son of William Henville Burford 
William Henville Burford (1807–1895), Australian soapmaker, founder of W. H. Burford & Sons
Samuel Colgate (1822–1897), American soapmaker, son of William Colgate
William Colgate (1783–1857), British-American soapmaker, founder of Colgate
Edward Rider Cook (1836–1898), English soapmaker
Joseph Crompton (1840–1901), English-Australian soapmaker
Arthur Crosfield (1865–1938), English soapmaker, son of Joseph Crosfield
Joseph Crosfield (1792–1844), English soapmaker
Alexander Stockton Cussons (1914–1986), English soap manufacturer, son of Alexander Tom Cussons
Alexander Tom Cussons (1875–1951), English soapmaker, son of Thomas Tomlinson Cussons
Leslie Cussons (1907–1963), English soap manufacturer, son of Alexander Tom Cussons 
Thomas Tomlinson Cussons (1838–1927), English soapmaker, founder and chairman of the soap manufacturing company Cussons & Son
John Mills McCallum (1847–1920), Scottish soap manufacturer
Arthur McKenzie Dodson (1819–1874), American soapmaker
N. K. Fairbank (1829–1903), American soap manufacturer
Joseph Fels (1853–1914), American soap manufacturer, developer of Fels-Naptha
 Peter Fenger (1719–1774), Danish soap manufacturer
 Else Fenger, Danish soap manufacturer
Josiah Franklin (1657–1745), English-American soapmaker, father of Benjamin Franklin
James Gamble (1803–1891), Irish-American soapmaker, co-founder of Procter & Gamble
William Gossage (1799–1877), English soap manufacturer
Alfred John Hampson (1864–1924), Australian soap manufacturer
John Nelson Hinkle (1854–1905), American soapmaker
 Jacob Holm, Danish soap-maker
Robert Spear Hudson (1812–1884), English soap manufacturer
Robert William Hudson (1856–1937), English soap manufacturer, son of Robert Spear Hudson
Antonius Johannes Jurgens (1867–1945), Dutch-English soap manufacturer 
Derreck Kayongo (born 1970), Ugandan-American soapmaker
William Hesketh Lever (1851–1925), English soapmaker, co-founder of Lever Brothers
Andrew Pears (ca. 1770–1845), English soapmaker, founder of Pears Soap
Charles Upfold (1834–1919), English-Australian soapmaker
Joseph Watson (1873–1922), English soap manufacturer

soap-makers
Soaps